The Major is an 1881 comedic play produced by Edward Harrigan and Tony Hart.

It debuted to a full house at the new Theatre Comique on Broadway in New York City on August 29, 1881. Songs contributed by David Braham include "Major Gilfeather", "Miranda, When We Are Made One", "Veteran's Guards' Cadets", "Clara Jenkins' Tea" and "4-11-44". It ran for over 150 performances, closing on January 7, 1882, the longest of any Harrigan and Hart production at that time.

The play was revived in March 1885 at the Fourteenth Street Theatre.

Cast
Edward Harrigan as Major Gilfeather
Annie Mack as Arabella Pinch
Tony Hart as Henry Higgins
Marie Gorenflo at Amelia
Edward Burt as Granville Bright
Annie Yeamans as Miranda Biggs
Michael F. Drew as Percival Popp
Gertie Granville as Henrietta

References

External links
 1911 recording of "Clara Jenkins' Tea" at Archive.org

American plays
1882 plays
Broadway plays